Iocaste, also known as , is a retrograde irregular satellite of Jupiter. It was discovered by a team of astronomers from the University of Hawaii including: David C. Jewitt, Yanga R. Fernandez, and Eugene Magnier led by Scott S. Sheppard in 2000, and given the temporary designation .

Iocaste orbits Jupiter at an average distance of 20.723 million kilometers in 632 earth days, at an inclination of 147° to the ecliptic (146° to Jupiter's equator) with an eccentricity of 0.2874.

It was named in October 2002 after Jocasta, the mother/wife of Oedipus in Greek mythology. The name ending in "e" was chosen in accordance with the International Astronomical Union's policy for designating outer moons with retrograde orbits.

Iocaste belongs to the Ananke group, believed to be the remnants of a break-up of a captured heliocentric asteroid.

The satellite is about 5 kilometres in diameter and appears grey (colour indices B−V=0.63, R−V=0.36), similar to C-type asteroids.

See also 

 Moons of Jupiter
 Praxidike

References

Further reading
Ephemeris IAU-MPC NSES
Mean orbital parameters NASA JPL

Ananke group
Moons of Jupiter
Irregular satellites
Discoveries by Scott S. Sheppard
Discoveries by David C. Jewitt
Discoveries by Yanga R. Fernandez
Discoveries by Eugene A. Magnier
20001123
Moons with a retrograde orbit